Paul Doherty is a former inter-county goalkeeper for Galway.

Doherty made his Championship debut against Mayo in May 2007 and has been a first choice for the county in the Championship ever since. In the 2007 Connacht SFC semi-final against Leitrim, the then manager of Galway, Peter Forde, praised Doherty after Donal Brennan's shot was stopped by Doherty. "The opposition is always going to have chances during a 70 minute game. That is what we expect our goalkeeper to do, to pull off a great save like that when it is needed and thankfully he did that. It is important that when the opposition get in on goal that you have a goalie who can pull off a save like that and he proved that today," Forde said. Galway won the game by 0-17 to 1-10

He has played in two Connacht finals, in 2007, losing to Sligo, and in 2008, defeating Mayo.

Doherty plays his club football with the Tuam Stars. His brother, Conor, was a member of Galway's victorious All-Ireland Minor Championship team in 2007.

References

Currently playing in Brisbane Australia for John Mitchels Gaelic football Club 2014 Champions.

Year of birth missing (living people)
Living people
Gaelic football goalkeepers
Galway inter-county Gaelic footballers
Tuam Stars Gaelic footballers